Oblates of Mary is a name sometimes used for several Roman Catholic religious orders.

Missionary Oblates of Mary Immaculate
Oblates of the Virgin Mary
Benedictines of Mary, Queen of Apostles